The men's synchronized 3 metre platform competition of the diving events at the 2011 Pan American Games was held on October 26 at the Scotiabank Aquatics Center. The defending Pan American Games champion were Troy Dumais and Mitch Richeson of the United States.

The synchronized diving competitions all consist of one rounds.  All teams compete in a single round of six dives.

Eleven judges evaluate each dive, three each for each individual diver, and five for the synchronization, giving the diver/dive a score between 0 and 10 with increments of 0.5. The highest and lowest scores from each judge for each individual diver and the highest and lowest scores for synchronization are dropped.  The remaining five scores are added together and multiplied by the degree of difficulty to get the raw score.  The raw score is then multiplied by 0.6 to get the final score for the dive.

Schedule
All times are Central Daylight Time (UTC-5).

Results
The final round was held on October 26.

References 

Diving at the 2011 Pan American Games